Iraqi Airways Company, operating as Iraqi Airways is the national carrier of Iraq, headquartered in Baghdad One of the oldest airlines in the Middle East, Iraqi Airways operates 5 domestic and 10 international routes in Africa, Asia and Europe since having resumed operations in 2003, 7 others were suspended in between. The airline was said to have ceased operations on 26 May 2010, partly due to claims for compensation from Kuwait arising out of the Gulf War, but continues to operate domestic and regional routes till today.

Iraqi Airways was founded in 1945 and is a member of the Arab Air Carriers Organization. They operated the first flight on 29 January 1946, ever since they expanded into a global airline covering a wide network of destinations in Africa, Asia, Europe, North and South America prior to the 1980–88 Iran–Iraq War as well as the 1990 Iraqi invasion of Kuwait, ensuing sanctions brought the airline's services to a halt, random charters for Hajj were operated in defiance during the 90s.

The destination list shows airports that are served by Iraqi Airways as part of its regular scheduled passenger services. The list includes the city and country name; the airport codes of the International Air Transport Association (IATA airport code) and the International Civil Aviation Organization (ICAO airport code); the airport name; additionally, there are labels for airports that are the airline's base and terminated stations

List

Note - Iraqi Airways also served Lydda in British Mandate Palestine up until early May 1948.

References

Iraqi Airways
Lists of airline destinations